Clint Rea Sodowsky (born July 13, 1972) is an American former professional baseball pitcher. He played in Major League Baseball (MLB) for the Detroit Tigers, Pittsburgh Pirates, Arizona Diamondbacks, and St. Louis Cardinals.

Sodowsky was drafted by the Tigers in the ninth round of the 1991 Major League Baseball draft, and made his MLB debut on September 4, 1995. He appeared in his final game on May 22, 1999.

External links

1972 births
Living people
Akron Aeros players
Albuquerque Isotopes players
American expatriate baseball players in Canada
Arizona Diamondbacks players
Baseball players from Oklahoma
Bristol Tigers players
Calgary Cannons players
Carolina Mudcats players
Connors State Cowboys baseball players
Detroit Tigers players
Fayetteville Generals players
Gulf Coast Braves players
Jacksonville Suns players
Lakeland Tigers players
Major League Baseball pitchers
Memphis Redbirds players
Mississippi Braves players
Oklahoma RedHawks players
Pensacola Pelicans players
People from Ponca City, Oklahoma
Pittsburgh Pirates players
Scranton/Wilkes-Barre Red Barons players
St. Louis Cardinals players
Toledo Mud Hens players
Tucson Sidewinders players
Tulsa Drillers players